Stanley Patrick Johnson (born 18 August 1940) is a British-French author and former politician who was Member of the European Parliament (MEP) for Wight and Hampshire East from 1979 to 1984. A former employee of the World Bank and the European Commission, he has written books on environmental and population issues. His six children include Boris Johnson, who was prime minister of the United Kingdom from 2019 to 2022. He is a member of the Conservative Party.

Personal life 
Stanley Johnson was born in 1940 in Penzance, Cornwall, the son of Osman Kemal (later known as Wilfred Johnson) and Irene Williams (daughter of Stanley Fred Williams of Bromley, Kent, who was the grandson of Sir George Williams, and Marie Louise de Pfeffel). His paternal grandfather, Ali Kemal Bey, one of the last interior ministers of the Ottoman government, was assassinated in 1922 during the Turkish War of Independence. Stanley's father was born in 1909 in Bournemouth, and his birth was registered as Osman Ali Wilfred Kemal. Osman's Anglo-Swiss mother Winifred Brun died shortly after giving birth. Ali Kemal returned to the Ottoman Empire in 1912, whereafter Osman Wilfred and his sister Selma were brought up by their English grandmother, Margaret Brun, and took her maiden name, Johnson, Stanley's father thus becoming Wilfred Johnson.

Johnson's maternal grandmother's parents were Hubert Freiherr von Pfeffel (born in Munich in the Kingdom of Bavaria on 8 December 1843) and his wife Hélène Arnous-Rivière (born on 14 January 1862). Hubert von Pfeffel was the son of Karl Freiherr von Pfeffel (born in Dresden in the Kingdom of Saxony on 22 November 1811; died in Munich on 25 January 1890) by his marriage in Augsburg on 16 February 1836 to Karolina von Rothenburg (born in the Free City of Frankfurt on 28 November 1805; died in Frankfurt on 13 February 1872), herself said to be the illegitimate daughter of Prince Paul of Württemberg by Friederike Porth.

Stanley Johnson attended Sherborne School, Dorset. While still an undergraduate studying English at Exeter College, Oxford, he took part in the Marco Polo Expedition with Tim Severin and Michael de Larrabeiti, travelling on a motorcycle and sidecar from Oxford to Venice and on to India and Afghanistan. The adventure led to the publication of Severin's 1964 book Tracking Marco Polo, with photographs by de Larrabeiti.

While studying at Columbia University in 1963, Johnson married the painter Charlotte Fawcett in Marylebone, with whom he had four children: Boris, former Leader of the Conservative Party and Prime Minister of the United Kingdom; Rachel, journalist and former editor-in-chief of The Lady; Jo, former Conservative MP for Orpington, former Minister of State for Universities, and former Head of the Lex Column at the Financial Times; and Leo, film-maker and entrepreneur. He dropped out of Columbia after a year. Johnson and Fawcett divorced in 1979. He married Jennifer Kidd in Westminster in 1981 and they had two children, Julia and Maximilian.

In July 2020, during the COVID-19 pandemic, Johnson posted pictures on Instagram of himself travelling to Athens, Greece. He was criticised by Liberal Democrat MP Jamie Stone for travelling at a time when guidance under lockdown was to avoid "all but essential international travel". At the time, Greece had reopened its borders but banned direct travel from the United Kingdom; Johnson had circumvented Greece's rules by travelling via Bulgaria.

In December 2020, Johnson stated that he was applying for a French passport to retain mobility and residence rights in the European Union, saying: "It's not a question of becoming French. If I understand correctly I am French! My mother was born in France, her mother was completely French as was her grandfather."

Career

Johnson has previously worked at the World Bank and was the Head of Prevention of Pollution Division at the European Commission from 1973 to 1979. He has a great interest in the environment. In 2010 he became chairman of the Gorilla Organisation, a body dedicated to saving the world's last remaining gorillas from extinction.  He was previously a board member of Plantlife International.

Politics 
At the 2005 general election, Johnson stood for the Conservative Party in the constituency of Teignbridge, where he came second behind Richard Younger-Ross of the Liberal Democrats.

In May 2008, Johnson hoped to be selected to contest his son Boris's parliamentary seat of Henley for the Conservative Party.  However, the local Conservative party had chosen three local people as possible candidates and on 30 May, local councillor John Howell was selected to fight the by-election.

Having supported the Remain campaign during the 2016 European Union membership referendum, in October 2017 he came out in support of the United Kingdom leaving the European Union, stating that "the time has come to bail out" and cited the approach and attitude of the European Commission president Jean-Claude Juncker as a major factor in his change of mind. He added that argument and debate over the length or detail of any transition or implementation period is expected but the ultimate "end-state" of the UK leaving the European Union is decided.

Books and other writing 
He has published a number of books dealing with environmental issues and nine novels, including The Commissioner, which was made into a 1998 film starring John Hurt. In 1962 he won the Newdigate Prize for Poetry.

The Marburg Virus (1982, Heinemann) ISBN 0-434-37704-X

His 2015 novel The Virus is a thriller about the rise of a mysterious virus and the fight to stop a deadly pandemic

He has written a memoir, Stanley I Presume, which was published in March 2009.

For a time, starting on 26 May 2005, he wrote a weekly column for the G2 section of The Guardian, and continues to write for various newspapers and magazines, often on environmental topics.

Television 
He was one of the first regular hosts of the late night discussion programme The Last Word on Channel 4's More4 channel, and made an appearance on Have I Got News For You on 7 May 2004.

In November 2017, Johnson was confirmed as a contestant for the seventeenth series of I'm a Celebrity...Get Me Out of Here!. He was the fifth person to be eliminated from the show, finishing in seventh place. In 2018, alongside eight other celebrities, he appeared on the BBC programme The Real Marigold Hotel.

In February 2020 he appeared on BBC Two's Celebrity Antiques Road Trip.

Awards 
In 1983 he received the RSPCA Richard Martin Award for Outstanding Services to animal welfare. He was for many years an ambassador for the UNEP Convention on the Conservation of Migratory Species of Wild Animals based in Bonn, Germany.

In October 2015 Johnson was awarded the RSPB Medal by the Royal Society for the Protection of Birds for his role in the creation of one of the cornerstones of Europe's nature conservation policy – the Habitats Directive (1992).

In December 2015 he received the World Wide Fund for Nature Leader for a Living Planet Award.

Public statements 
In August 2018, Johnson said his son Boris Johnson's comments that Muslim women who wear burkas look like "letterboxes" and "bank robbers" did not go far enough, and that criticism of the comments had been "synthetic indignation" created by political opponents.

In November 2019, Johnson appeared on BBC's Victoria Derbyshire show and was told that one viewer had called his son Boris "Pinocchio". Johnson replied, "Pinocchio? That requires a degree of literacy which I think the Great British public doesn't necessarily have." Johnson defended his statement by arguing that he was being humorous and said that it was "utterly absurd and wrong that you can read out on air a tweet coming in from one of your readers which calls the prime minister a liar. I think it is amazing you can do that".

In June 2022, ahead of Johnson's visit to China for a television programme on the explorer Marco Polo, Johnson called for the UK parliament  to lift a ban on the Chinese ambassador to the UK entering the parliamentary estate.

Allegations of spousal abuse and inappropriate touching 
Biographer Tom Bower records in an interview with his first wife Charlotte Fawcett that 'he hit me many times, over many years'. On one occasion in the 1970s he broke her nose, with Fawcett stating: "He broke my nose. He made me feel like I deserved it. I want the truth to be told.". She also suffered a nervous breakdown which required several months of treatment in a psychiatric ward

On 15 November 2021, Caroline Nokes accused Johnson of inappropriately touching her at the Conservative Party conference in Blackpool in 2003. Johnson said that he had "no recollection of Caroline Nokes at all". Following this, journalist Ailbhe Rea accused Johnson of groping her at the 2019 Conservative Party conference.

Works
Gold Drain (1967, Heinemann) ISBN B0000CNKG6
Panther Jones for President (1968, Heinemann) 
Life without Birth: A Journey Through the Third World in Search of the Population Explosion (1970, Heinemann) 
The Green Revolution (1972, Hamilton) 
The Population Problem (1973, David & C) 
The Politics of Environment (1973, T Stacey) 
The Urbane Guerilla (1975, Macmillan) 
Pollution Control Policy of the EEC (1978, Graham & Trotman) 
The Doomsday Deposit (1979, EP Dutton) 
The Marburg Virus (1982, Heinemann) 
Tunnel (1984, Heinemann) 
Antarctica: The Last Great Wilderness (1985, Weidenfeld & N) 
The Commissioner (1987, Century) 
World Population and the United Nations (1987, Cambridge UP) 
Dragon River (1989, Frederick Muller) 
The Earth Summit: The United Nations Conference on Environment and Development (UNCED) (1993, Kluwer Law International) 
World Population - Turning the Tide (1994, Kluwer Law International) 
The Environmental Policy of the European Communities (1995, Kluwer Law International) 
The Politics of Population: Cairo, 1994 (1995, Earthscan) 
Icecap (1999, Cameron May) 
Stanley I Presume (2009, Fourth Estate Ltd) 
Survival: Saving Endangered Migratory Species [co-authored with Robert Vagg] (2010, Stacey International) 
Where the Wild Things Were: Travels of a Conservationist (2012, Stacey International) 
UNEP The First 40 Years; A Narrative by Stanley Johnson (2012, United Nations Environment Programme) 
Stanley I Resume (2014, Biteback) 
The Virus (2015, Witness Impulse) 
Kompromat (2017, Point Blank)

References

External links
Stanley Johnson personal site
 
Biographical Note, European Environment Agency
Channel 4 Election Weblogs - Stanley Johnson
The Guardian ruined my political career! Stanley Johnson's column 26 May 2005.
Newspaper articles by Stanley Johnson
Interview with Stanley Johnson, London 2011, for History of the European Commission (1973-86)

1940 births
Living people
Alumni of Exeter College, Oxford
Columbia University alumni
Conservative Party (UK) MEPs
MEPs for England 1979–1984
English people of Circassian descent
English people of German descent
English people of French descent
English people of Turkish descent
People educated at Sherborne School
People from Penzance
Conservative Party (UK) parliamentary candidates
British politicians of Turkish descent
English people of Swiss descent
Parents of prime ministers of the United Kingdom
I'm a Celebrity...Get Me Out of Here! (British TV series) participants
Boris Johnson family